Rodney K. Smith (10 May 1951 – 26 July 2020) was an American academic and the 6th president of Southern Virginia University (SVU) (2004-2011). After retiring from SVU, he served as a Distinguished Professor of Law and director of the Sports Law and Policy Center at the Thomas Jefferson School of Law (2011-2014), a Distinguished Professor of Practice and director of the Sports Law and Business Program at the Sandra Day O'Connor College of Law (2014-2016), and as the David and Laurea Stirling Professor of Constitutional Studies and director of the Center for Constitutional Studies at Utah Valley University (2016-2020).

Biography 
Smith was a convert to the Church of Jesus Christ of Latter-day Saints (LDS Church) and a lifelong academic. He was an undergraduate student at UC-Irvine, Georgetown University, and the Western State College of Colorado (B.A., 1973), and a graduate student at the University of Virginia, Brigham Young University (J.D., 1977), and the University of Pennsylvania (LL.M. and S.J.D).

Smith served as the dean of law schools at Capital University (1989-1994), during which time he also served as bishop of an LDS Church ward, the University of Montana (1993-1995), the University of Arkansas at Little Rock, and the University of Memphis (2003-2004).

Smith also served as a member of the board of trustees of the American Academy of Liberal Education.

Smith received honorary doctorates from Capital University (2002) and SVU (2012).

Bibliography 
Public Prayer and the Constitution : A Case Study in Constitutional Interpretation
Getting off on the Wrong Foot and Back On Again: A Reexamination of the History of the Framing of the Religion Clauses of the First Amendment and a Critique of the Reynolds and Everson Decisions
Nonpreferentialism in Establishment Clause Analysis: A Response to Professor Laycock
The Role of Religion in Progressive Constitutionalism
Religion and the Press: Keeping First Amendment Values in Balance (with Patrick A. Shea)

Notes

References 
 Church News, April 28, 2007

American leaders of the Church of Jesus Christ of Latter-day Saints
American lawyers
J. Reuben Clark Law School alumni
Capital University Law School faculty
Converts to Mormonism
Living people
Southern Virginia University faculty
Heads of universities and colleges in the United States
University of Arkansas at Little Rock faculty
University of Memphis faculty
University of Montana faculty
University of North Dakota faculty
University of San Diego faculty
Widener University faculty
Deans of law schools in the United States
Latter Day Saints from Virginia
Latter Day Saints from Tennessee
Latter Day Saints from Arkansas
Latter Day Saints from Montana
Latter Day Saints from Pennsylvania
Latter Day Saints from North Dakota
Latter Day Saints from California
Latter Day Saints from Ohio
Latter Day Saints from Utah
1951 births